Charlie Hunter Trio is the debut album by jazz guitarist Charlie Hunter. It was released by Prawn Song Records, a label owned by Les Claypool. Claypool produced the album, and his former bandmate, Jay Lane, played drums. Dave Ellis joined in on saxophone. Hunter played a seven-string guitar.

Production
The album was recorded by Claypool for one hundred dollars.

Critical reception
AllMusic wrote that "the trio provides an interesting, yet accessible, groove-driven, funky, improvised jam for a new generation of jazz fans." Trouser Press wrote: "Though deceptively clean, its diffuse, fusiony compositions don’t fully convey the group’s sass and spirit — only 'Dance of the Jazz Fascists' ... comes close."

Track listing

Personnel
 Charlie Hunter – seven-string guitar
 Scott Jensen – trumpet
 Dave Ellis  – tenor saxophone
 Miles Perkins – double bass
 Jay Lane – drums
 Scott Roberts – congas
 Andre Marshall – bells, cow bell

References

1993 debut albums
Charlie Hunter albums
Post-bop albums
Acid jazz albums
Mammoth Records albums
Prawn Song Records albums